Ian Hurdle (born 3 February 1975) is a former footballer who is last known to have played as a midfielder. Born in England, he was a Turks and Caicos Islands international.

Career

He has worked as a coach in the Turks and Caicos Islands under-23.

He is  a well-known real estate agent in Turks and Caicos Islands.

He was eligible to represent England internationally, having been born there.

References

External links
 

Living people
1975 births
Association football midfielders
Turks and Caicos Islands international footballers
Turks and Caicos Islands footballers